Basic beliefs (also commonly called foundational beliefs or core beliefs) are, under the epistemological view called foundationalism,  the axioms of a belief system.

Categories of beliefs 
Foundationalism holds that all beliefs must be justified in order to be known. Beliefs therefore fall into two categories:
 Beliefs that are properly basic, in that they do not depend upon justification of other beliefs, but on something outside the realm of belief (a "non-doxastic justification")
 Beliefs that derive from one or more basic beliefs, and therefore depend on the basic beliefs for their validity

Description 
Within this basic framework of foundationalism exist a number of views regarding which types of beliefs qualify as properly basic; that is, what sorts of beliefs can be justifiably held without the justification of other beliefs.

In classical foundationalism, beliefs are held to be properly basic if they are either self-evident axioms, or evident to the senses (empiricism). However Anthony Kenny and others have argued that this is a self-refuting idea.
 In modern foundationalism, beliefs are held to be properly basic if they were either self-evident axiom or incorrigible. One such axiom is René Descartes's axiom, Cogito ergo sum ("I think, therefore I am"). Incorrigible (lit. uncorrectable) beliefs are those one can believe without possibly being proven wrong. Notably, the evidence of the senses is not seen as properly basic because, Descartes argued, all our sensory experience could be an illusion.
 In what Keith Lehrer has called "fallible foundationalism", also known as "moderate foundationalism", the division between inferential and non-inferential belief is retained, but the requirement of incorrigibility is dropped. This, it is claimed, allows the senses to resume their traditional role as the basis of non-inferential belief despite their fallibility.
 In reformed epistemology, beliefs are held to be properly basic if they are reasonable and consistent with a sensible world view.

Anti-foundationalism rejects foundationalism and denies there is some fundamental belief or principle which is the basic ground or foundation of inquiry and knowledge.

See also
 Doxastic logic
First principle
 Mental model
 Mental representation
 Mindset
 Paradigm
 Set (psychology)
 Schema (psychology)
 Worldview

Notes and references

Belief
Concepts in epistemology
Foundationalism